An "it girl" is a young woman perceived to have both sex appeal and an engaging personality.

It girl or The It Girl may also refer to:

People
 Clara Bow (1905–1965), American actress, so nicknamed after her 1927 film It

Literature
 The It Girl (novel series), by Cecily von Ziegesar
 The It Girl (novel), the 2005 first novel in the series
 It Girl, an Atomics comic book character

Music
 The It Girl (album), by Sleeper, 1996
 It Girl (EP), by Petric, 2015
 "It Girl" (Jason Derulo song), 2011
 "It Girl" (Pharrell Williams song), 2014
 "It Girl", a song by Apink from Seven Springs of Apink, 2011
 "It Girl", a song by Elle King from Shake the Spirit, 2018

See also
 It Girls, a 2002 documentary film

Nicknames in film